This is a List of Milwaukeeans, notable citizens of Milwaukee, Wisconsin.

Born and raised in Milwaukee

The following people were born and spent a significant number of their growing-up years in Milwaukee.
 

 George A. Abert, member of the Wisconsin State Assembly and the Wisconsin State Senate; son of George Abert (listed below)

 Jim Abrahams, director and screenwriter
 David Adler, architect who designed over 200 estates during the "Great American Fashion era"
 Amy Aiken, winemaker
 Marc Alaimo, actor who played many Star Trek characters
 Carl Allen, musician
 Vivian Anderson, All-American Girls Professional Baseball League player (Milwaukee Chicks)
 Joseph Anthony, playwright, actor, and director
 Antler, poet
 Lynne Arriale, musician; professor
 Les Aspin, U.S. Secretary of Defense 
 Steve Avery, NFL player for the Houston Oilers, Green Bay Packers, and the Pittsburgh Steelers
 Mitchell Ayres, bandleader for Perry Como and The Hollywood Palace
 David Backes, author; professor
 Gerhard A. Bading, U.S. diplomat
 Frank Ellis Bamford, U.S. military office
 Jimmy Banks, soccer player
 Ben Bard, actor
 Shorty Barr, NFL player and head coach
 Dede Barry, Olympic medalist
 Tommy Bartlett, entertainment mogul and showman; created Tommy Bartlett's Thrill Show in Wisconsin Dells, Wisconsin
 Louis Bashell, Slovenian-style polka musician
 William Bast, screenwriter
 John C. Becher, actor
 Robert J. Beck, professor
 Travis Beckum, NFL player for New York Giants
 Jeffery Dahmer, Serial Killer
 Chuck Belin, NFL player 
 Harry Bell, Medal of Honor recipient
 Lawrencia "Bambi" Bembenek, police officer convicted of murdering husband's ex-wife
 Eric Benet, R&B singer; was married to Halle Berry
 David Benke, President of Atlantic District of Lutheran Church–Missouri Synod
 Mark W. Bennett, U.S. District Court Judge in Iowa
 Michael Bennett, NFL player
James Benning, filmmaker
 Lamont Bentley, actor; best known for his role as Hakeem Campbell on television series Moesha
 Scott Bergold, NFL player
 George Berry, NFL player
 Abner Biberman, actor and director
 Dick Bilda, NFL player
 Roman R. Blenski, Wisconsin State Senator
 Joseph Colt Bloodgood, physician
 Wheeler Peckham Bloodgood, lawyer 
 Adam Bob, NFL player
 Otto Bock, Justice of Colorado Supreme Court
 Bill Boedeker, NFL player for the Chicago Rockets, Cleveland Browns, Green Bay Packers, and the Philadelphia Eagles
 Frank Bohlmann, NFL player
 Peter Bonerz, actor
 Mark Borchardt, independent filmmaker; best known as subject of American Movie
 Larry Borenstein, art and music promoter
 Bob Botz, MLB player
 Timmy Bowers, professional basketball player, 2006 Israeli Basketball Premier League MVP
 David Braden, NFL player
 Gil Brandt, executive of Dallas Cowboys
 John W. Breen, NFL general manager
 Cindy Bremser, Olympic athlete; Pan American Games medalist
 Terry Brennan, head coach of Notre Dame Fighting Irish football team
 Jeff Bridich, MLB general manager
 Pamela Britton, actress
 Mandy Brooks, MLB player
 Fred Brown, NBA player, First Team All American at the University of Iowa
 Judi Brown, Olympic medalist; Pan American Games gold medalist
 William George Bruce, author, historian, publisher, civic leader for Milwaukee Auditorium and Port of Milwaukee
 J.T. Bruett, MLB player
 George Brumder, newspaper publisher
 Fabian Bruskewitz, Roman Catholic bishop
 Felice Bryant, songwriter; member of Songwriters Hall of Fame, and Country Music Hall of Fame
 Art Bues, MLB player
 Rodney Buford, NBA player
 Brian Burke, Wisconsin politician
 Charles C. Butler, Chief Justice of Colorado Supreme Court
 Jackie Cain, musician
 Daryl Carter, NFL player
 John M. Cavey, Wisconsin legislator and lawyer
 Paul Cebar, musician
 James Chance (James Siegfried, a/k/a James White), saxophonist, songwriter and singer, key figure in No Wave movement
 John Moses Cheney, U.S. District Court Judge in Florida
 Ted Cieslak, MLB player
 Alvin J. Clasen, Wisconsin State Assembly man
 John Louis Coffey, Judge of U.S. Court of Appeals
 James Kelsey Cogswell, U.S. Navy admiral
 Wilbur J. Cohen, U.S. Secretary of Health, Education, and Welfare
 Irv Comp, NFL player
 Michael Copps, Commissioner of Federal Communications Commission
 Ray "Crash" Corrigan, actor; first celebrity featured on box of Wheaties
 Anthony Crivello, Tony Award-winning actor
 Lave Cross, MLB player for 21 years
 John Cudahy, U.S. diplomat
 Michael Cudahy, entrepreneur, grand-nephew of Michael Cudahy (industrialist)
 Richard Dickson Cudahy, Judge of U.S. Court of Appeals
 Robert M. Curley, legislator and judge
 Pat Curran, NFL player
 James B. Currie, U.S. Air Force Major General
 John Thomas Curtis, botanist and ecologist; Bray Curtis dissimilarity is partially named for him
 Joseph Czerwinski, Wisconsin State Assembly member
 Randy Dean, NFL player and Olympic athlete
 Robert Dean, Olympic athlete
 Ashton Dearholt, actor
 Robert G. Dela Hunt, Wisconsin State Assembly member
 Steve de Shazer, psychotherapist who developed use of solution-focused brief therapy
 Tom Dempsey, NFL player
 Edward J. Dengel, Wisconsin State Representative
 Abraham DeSomer, Medal of Honor recipient
 John R. Devitt, Wisconsin State Representative
 Michael Dhuey, electrical and computer engineer; co-inventor of the Macintosh II and the iPod
 Lavern Dilweg, NFL player and U.S. Representative
 John Doehring, NFL player
 Bernardine Dohrn, leader of the Weather Underground Organization
 John P. Donnelly, Wisconsin State Representative
 Michael Dorf, entrepreneur, founder of Knitting Factory
 Stephanie Dosen, musician
 Jeff Doucette, actor
 Donn F. Draeger, martial artist
 Randee Drew, professional football player
 Wally Dreyer, NFL player; coach of University of Wisconsin–Milwaukee Panthers football team
 Garrett Droppers, U.S. diplomat, President of University of South Dakota
 Ron Drzewiecki, NFL player
 Red Dunn, NFL player
 Will Durst, comedian
 Lawrence Eagleburger, U.S. Secretary of State
 Greg Eagles, actor
 Robert Easton, actor, acting teacher
 Al Eckert, MLB player
 Bob Eckl, NFL player
 Patrick Eddie, NBA player
 Kathryn Edwards, model, reality television star on The Real Housewives of Beverly Hills
 Herbert W. Ehrgott, U.S. Air Force general
 Brent Emery, Olympic medalist
 Trevor Enders, MLB player
 Howie Epstein, rock musician, producer, and bassist for Tom Petty and the Heartbreakers
 Terence T. Evans, jurist
 Tony Evers, 46th Governor of Wisconsin
 Ralph Evinrude, son of Ole Evinrude, inventor of world's first outboard motor, CEO Outdoor Marine Corp
 Thomas E. Fairchild, Chief Judge of the U.S. Court of Appeals
 Raleigh W. Falbe, Wisconsin state legislator
 Anton Falch, professional baseball player
 Frank Farkas, Florida state representative
 Hudson Fasching, NHL player
 Michael Feldman, radio personality for Public Radio International
 Michael Felger, sports radio talk show host
 Gene Felker, NFL player
 Happy Felsch, MLB player
 Thomasita Fessler, painter
 Edgar Fiedler (1929–2003), economist
 Julius Fiege, Wisconsin State Representative
 James E. Finnegan, Attorney General of Wisconsin
 Jack Finney, science-fiction and thriller writer; his novel The Body Snatchers was basis for movie Invasion of the Body Snatchers
 Brian Firkus, Drag Queen 
 Chris Foerster, NFL assistant coach
 Reginald Foster, Latinist
 Eduard Franz, actor
 Jacob Elias Friend, Wisconsin state legislator, businessman, lawyer
 Bruce Froemming, MLB umpire
 Todd Frohwirth, MLB player
 Fabian Gaffke, MLB player
 Max Galasinski, stonecutter, sculptor 
 Chris Gardner, self-made millionaire whose bout with homelessness is portrayed in film The Pursuit of Happyness
 Diante Garrett (born 1988), basketball player for Ironi Ness Ziona of the Israeli Basketball Premier League
 Augusts F. Gearhard, Deputy Chief of Chaplain of U.S. Air Force
 Warren Giese, head coach of South Carolina Gamecocks football team, South Carolina State Senator
 Herschel Burke Gilbert, film and television composer
 Hank Gillo, NFL player and head coach
 Martin Glendon, MLB player
 Carlos Glidden, co-inventor of first practical typewriter, with Christopher Sholes and Samuel W. Soule
 Danny Gokey, American Idol contestant
 Lamar Gordon, NFL player
 Angelo F. Greco, member of Wisconsin State Assembly
 Joseph A. Greco, member of Wisconsin State Assembly
 Abraham L. Grootemaat, member of Wisconsin State Assembly
 James Groppi, Roman Catholic priest and civil rights activist
 Eric Gugler, architect
 Jay Guidinger, NBA player
 John Gurda, writer and historian
 Carl Haessler, political activist
 Luise Haessler, linguist
 Eric E. Hagedorn, member of the Wisconsin State Assembly
 Jeffrey Robert Haines, Roman Catholic bishop
 Jaida Essence Hall, drag queen superstar and winner of the 12th season of RuPaul’s Drag Race
 Bo Hanley, NFL player and head coach
 Derrick Harden, NFL player
 Pat Harder, NFL player, member of College Football Hall of Fame
 Jason Hardtke, MLB player
 Kevin Harlan, sportscaster
 Dan Harmon, creator of the NBC television series Community, and co-creator of television series "Rick and Morty"
 Mildred Harnack, German resistance fighter during World War II, executed under orders from Adolf Hitler
 George Harper, MLB player
 Devin Harris, professional basketball player
 Jerry Harrison, keyboardist for new wave music group Talking Heads
 Kenny Harrison, world champion track and field athlete; Olympic gold medalist; Goodwill Games medalist
 Mike Hart, MLB player
 William Hartman, Distinguished Service Cross recipient
 James Michael Harvey, Roman Catholic bishop
 William Frederick Hase, U.S. Army Major General
 Jerome J. Hastrich, bishop of the Roman Catholic Diocese of Gallup
 Joe Hauser, MLB player
 Ned R. Healy, Los Angeles City Council member, 1943–44, member of Congress, 1945–47
 Bob Heinz, NFL player
 George Hekkers, NFL player
 Frederick Hemke, professor of saxophone at Northwestern University
 Marguerite Henry, award-winning children's author, known for books about animals
 Woody Herman, jazz singer, instrumentalist, and bandleader
 Keith K. Hilbig, General authority of the Church of Jesus Christ of Latter-day Saints
 Elizabeth Hirschboeck, humanitarian
 Deb Hoffmann, Winnie-the-Pooh memorabilia collector
 Jack Hueller, NFL player
 Doris Hursley, co-creator of General Hospital and daughter of Victor L. Berger
 Andy Hurley, Fall Out Boy
 Mike Huwiler, Olympic athlete; MLS player
 Caroline Ingalls (1839–1924), born in Brookfield, mother of famed author Laura Ingalls Wilder
 Einar H. Ingman Jr., Medal of Honor recipient
 Robert Jacobson, Lutheran bishop, then Roman Catholic priest
 Jeff Jagodzinski, NFL assistant coach, head coach of Boston College
 Eddie Jankowski, NFL player
 Dan Jansen, world champion speed skater; Olympic gold medalist; member of United States Olympic Hall of Fame; NHL assistant coach
 Al Jarreau, award-winning jazz singer
 Katherine Jashinski, United States Army soldier who refused orders to deploy to Afghanistan in 2006
 Salome Jens, actress, best known for portraying Female Shapeshifter on Star Trek: Deep Space Nine
 Jim Jodat, NFL player
 Harry G. John, philanthropist
 Mark Jones, NBA player
 Barbara Jordan, professional tennis player
 Elizabeth Jordan, writer, journalist
 Joe Just, MLB player
 Jane Kaczmarek, actress; best known as Lois in Malcolm in the Middle
 Brian "Kato" Kaelin, actor and house guest of O. J. Simpson during murders of Nicole Brown Simpson and Ronald Goldman
 Bob Kames, musician; popularized The Chicken Dance
 Karl Kassulke, NFL player
 Phil Katz, inventor of Zip archive file format
 Marie Kazmierczak, All-American Girls Professional Baseball League player
 Francis B. Keene, U.S. diplomat
 Ken Keltner, MLB player
 Skip Kendall (born 1964), professional golfer 
 Jacob J. Killa, Wisconsin State Representative
 Don Kindt, NFL player
 Don Kindt Jr., NFL player
 Louis Joseph Kirn, U.S. Navy admiral
 Jerry Kleczka, U.S. Representative
 Red Kleinow, MLB player
 Scott Klement, computer scientist
 Al Klug, professional football player
 Tony Knap, head coach of Utah State, Boise State and UNLV football teams
 Richard A. Knobloch, U.S. Air Force general
 Donald Knuth, computer scientist and author of The Art of Computer Programming
 Oscar Koch, U.S. Army general, member of Military Intelligence Hall of Fame
 Herman Koehler, head coach of Army football team; Master of the Sword of the United States Military Academy
 John J. Koepsell, Wisconsin State Representative and businessman
 Herb Kohl, U.S. Senator
 Don Kojis, NBA player
 Walter Charles Kraatz, zoologist
 Alvin Kraenzlein, Olympic gold medalist, member of National Track & Field Hall of Fame and United States Olympic Hall of Fame
 Jack Kramer, professional football player
 Ken Kranz, NFL player
 Ken Kratz (born ), lawyer, former district attorney of Calumet County, Wisconsin; law license was suspended for four months after sexting scandal
 Clarence Kretlow, Wisconsin State Representative
 Gus Krock, MLB player
 Leo Krzycki (1881–1966), labor union leader
 Tony Kubek, MLB player
 Ray Kuffel, professional football player
 Walter Kunicki, Wisconsin State Assembly
 Ralph Kurek, NFL player
Craig Kusick, MLB player
 August W. Laabs, Wisconsin State Assembly
 Chet Laabs, MLB player
 Carl Landry, NBA player
 Marcus Landry, NBA player
 Irv Langhoff, NFL player
 Jacob Latimore, singer and dancer
 Donald Laub, noted plastic surgeon
 Tom Laughlin, actor
 Tom Lee, professional baseball player
 David Lenz, artist
 John Leonora, professor of physiology and pharmacology at Loma Linda University
 Louise Lester, actress
 Dave Levenick, NFL player
 DeAndre Levy, NFL player
 Liberace, pianist and entertainer (West Allis)
 Al Lindow, NFL player
 James G. Lippert, Wisconsin State Representative and lawyer
 Jacob J. Litza Jr., Wisconsin State Representative and businessman
 Dick Loepfe, NFL player
 Fred Luderus, MLB player
 Arno H. Luehman, U.S. Air Force Major General
 Otto Luening (1900–1996), composer, early pioneer of electronic music
 Jerry Lunz, NFL player
 Alfred Lunt, Tony Award and Emmy Award-winning Broadway actor; appeared in over 24 plays with his wife Lynn Fontanne
 Rube Lutzke, MLB player
 Mel Maceau, professional football player
 Sandy MacKay, Michigan state representative
 Steve Mackay, drummer of Oil Tasters, BoDeans, Violent Femmes, Radio Romeo
 Beezie Madden, Olympic gold medalist
 Mark Maddox, NFL player
 Ira Madison III, television writer and podcaster
 Greg Mahlberg, MLB player
 Lester Maitland, pioneer U.S. Army aviator. In 1927 with Albert Hegenberger completed first flight from California to Hawaii
 David John Malloy, Roman Catholic bishop
 Dave Manders, NFL player
 Tom Mangan, Minnesota state legislator and educator
 Bob Mann, pro golfer
 Carl von Marr, painter
 Trixie Mattel, competed on season 7 of RuPaul's Drag Race, winner of season 3 of RuPaul's Drag Race All Stars, co-hosts a show on YouTube and has her own television series (The Trixie and Katya Show) on Viceland
 Tracy Mattes, track and field athlete and humanitarian
 John Matuszak, actor and NFL player
 Bob Mavis, professional baseball player
 George McBride, MLB manager
 Tim McCann, NFL player
 Arthur L. McCullough, U.S. Air Force general
 Ed McCully, Christian missionary killed during Operation Auca
 John McGivern, actor and writer
 Darel McKinney, Navy Cross and Distinguished Service Cross recipient
 Chuck Mercein, NFL player for the New York Giants, Green Bay Packers, and the New York Jets
 John L. Merkt, Wisconsin State Assembly
 Walter L. Merten, Wisconsin State Senate
 Louis L. Merz, member of the Wisconsin State Assembly
 Albert Gregory Meyer, Archbishop of Roman Catholic Archdiocese of Chicago
 Phil Micech, NFL player
 Candice Michelle, wrestler, model and actress, best known for television ads for Go Daddy
 Abner J. Mikva, Judge of the U.S. Court of Appeals
 Dick Miller, NBA player
 Thomas L. Miller, TV producer, co-founder of Miller-Boyett Productions
 Newton N. Minow, chairman of Federal Communications Commission
 Robert J. Modrzejewski, Medal of Honor recipient
 David Mogilka, lawyer and politician
 Jake Moreland, NFL player; assistant coach with Western Michigan Broncos football team
 Andrew "The Butcher" Mrotek, drummer for rock band The Academy Is...
 Aloisius Joseph Muench, Roman Catholic cardinal
 Joseph C. Murphy, Michigan state representative
 Robert Daniel Murphy, U.S. diplomat
 Rose Namajunas, mixed martial artist
 Alfredo Narciso, actor
 Clem Neacy, NFL player
 Kurt Neumann, singer, guitarist, and songwriter of the BoDeans
 Kurt Nimphius, NBA player
 Charles Niss, Wisconsin state legislator and businessman
 Haskell Noyes, conservationist
 Pat O'Brien, actor with over 100 screen credits
 Elli Ochowicz, Olympic athlete
 Robert Emmett O'Connor, actor
 Tad J. Oelstrom, U.S. Air Force Lieutenant General
 Nancy Olson, actress
 Chuck Ortmann, NFL player
 Oscar Osthoff, Olympic gold medalist; head coach of Washington State football team
 Nik Pace, first runner-up of America's Next Top Model, cycle 5
 Raymond A. Palmer, editor and author
 Frank Parker, International Tennis Hall of Fame member; won both the French and U.S. Championships
 Les Paul, jazz guitarist, inventor, pioneer in development of solid-body electric guitar (Waukesha)
 Don Pavletich, MLB player
 Cheryl Pawelski, record producer (Omnivore Recordings)
 Jim Peck, host of game shows The Big Showdown and Three's a Crowd; local history show I Remember Milwaukee
 Pat Peppler, NFL head coach
 Anthony Pettis, mixed martial artist signed with UFC
 Vel Phillips, politician, jurist and activist
 Amy Pietz, actress, known for role as Annie Spadaro in sitcom Caroline in the City
 Robert B. Pinter, biomedical engineer
 Paul Poberezny, founder of Experimental Aircraft Association and member of National Aviation Hall of Fame
 Milton Rice Polland, Marshall Islands diplomat
 Glen Pommerening, Wisconsin legislator
 Terry Porter, NBA player and head coach of Milwaukee Bucks
 Karl Priebe, artist
 Gene Puerling, singer
 Charlotte Rae (Lubotsky), TV/stage actress and singer; acted in Diff'rent Strokes and The Facts of Life
 Ellen Raskin, author, illustrator, and fashion designer; recipient of Newbery Medal
 Scottie Ray, actor
 Joel Rechlicz, NHL player
 Marshall Reckard, mechanic and politician
 Louise Goff Reece, U.S. Representative from Tennessee
 William Rehnquist, former Chief Justice of the United States Supreme Court (Shorewood)
 John E. Reilly Jr., Wisconsin legislator and judge
 Paul Samuel Reinsch, U.S. diplomat
 Henry S. Reuss, U.S. Representative
 John Ridley, author, television and movie producer
 Brad Rigby, MLB player
 Stuart Rindy, NFL player
 Jim Risch, U.S. Senator from Idaho
 Nick Roach, NFL player
 Fritz Roeseler, NFL player
 Brad Rowe, actor
 Loret Miller Ruppe, U.S. diplomat
 Margaret A. Rykowski, U.S. Navy admiral
 Herbert J. Ryser, mathematician, Bruck-Chowla-Ryser theorem and Ryser formula are named for him
 Ben L. Salomon, Medal of Honor recipient
 John Scardina, NFL player
 Christopher Scarver, convicted murderer who killed Jeffrey Dahmer 
 John C. Schafer, U.S. Representative
 Arlie Schardt, Olympic gold medalist
 Bob Scherbarth, MLB player
 Richard Schickel, author, film critic, and filmmaker
 Augustine Francis Schinner, first Roman Catholic Bishop of the Diocese of Superior
 Charles Asa Schleck, Roman Catholic bishop
 Herman Alfred Schmid, U.S. Air Force general
 Charles C. Schmidt, Wisconsin state legislator
 John G. Schmitz, U.S. Representative from California
 Frank Schneiberg, MLB player
 Roy Schoemann, NFL player
 Otto Schomberg, professional baseball player
 Paul Schramka, MLB player
 Charles M. Schrimpf, Wisconsin State Representative
 Michael Schultz, filmmaker and television director
 Mark J. Seitz, Roman Catholic bishop
 Bud Selig, MLB commissioner, owner of Milwaukee Brewers
 Paul Shenar, actor
 Paul Sicula, Wisconsin State Representative
 Cornelius Sidler, Wisconsin State Representative
 John Otto Siegel, Medal of Honor recipient
 Lance Sijan, first USAFA graduate to be awarded the Medal of Honor
 Carl Silvestri, NFL player
 Al Simmons, Hall of Fame Major League Baseball player
 Herbert A. Simon, Nobel laureate and Turing Award winner for work in artificial intelligence, cognition, and decision-making
 John Sisk Jr., NFL player
 Steve Sisolak, Governor of Nevada
 Leland Sklar, bass player
 Fred R. Sloan, U.S. Air National Guard Major General
 Dave Smith, professional football player
 Dick Smith, software engineer and computer consultant
 Tom Snyder, talk show host of The Tomorrow Show and The Late Late Show with Tom Snyder
 Samuel W. Soule, co-inventor of first practical typewriter, with Christopher Sholes and Carlos Glidden
 Speech (Todd Thomas), musician, lead singer of Arrested Development
 Latrell Sprewell, four-time All-Star professional basketball player
 Clement Stachowiak, Wisconsin State Representative
 Drew Stafford, NHL player
 Kenneth M. Stampp, professor of history at the University of California, Berkeley
 Howard Stark, NFL player
 Pete Stark, U.S. Representative from California
 Jerome Steever, Olympic medalist
 Henry J. Stehling, U.S. Air Force general
 Christian Steinmetz, member of Naismith Memorial Basketball Hall of Fame
 Erich C. Stern, Wisconsin State Representative and lawyer
 Bill Stetz, NFL player
 Brooks Stevens, automotive and industrial designer who developed the concept of planned obsolescence
 Lester Stevens, Olympic athlete
 Philip Stieg, neurosurgeon
 Joseph Stika, U.S. Coast Guard Vice Admiral
 Herbert Stothart, film composer, member of the Songwriters Hall of Fame
 Peter Straub, fiction writer and poet; best known as a horror-genre author
 Daryl Stuermer, lead guitarist for Phil Collins, guitar and bass for Genesis
 Johnny Strzykalski, NFL player
 Timothy S. Sullivan, U.S. Coast Guard admiral
 Jayapataka Swami, religious leader for International Society for Krishna Consciousness
 George Talsky, businessman and politician
 Jack Taschner, MLB player
 Todd Temkin, contemporary poet and cultural activist
 Clinton Textor, Wisconsin State Representative
 Reinhold Thiessenhusen, Wisconsin State Representative
 Fred Thomas, MLB player
 Arthur Thrall, artist
 Spencer Tracy, actor who appeared in 74 films from 1930 to 1967
 Clement A. Trott, U.S. Army Major General
 Dan Turk, NFL player
 Alfred Tweedy, Connecticut state senator
 Aaron Twerski (born 1939), lawyer and the Irwin and Jill Cohen Professor of Law at Brooklyn Law School, as well as a former Dean and professor of tort law at Hofstra University School of Law
 Judy Tyler (Judith Mae Hess), actress, starred opposite Elvis Presley in Jailhouse Rock
 Bob Uecker, MLB player, actor, and Hall of Fame sportscaster
 Neal Ulevich, photographer, recipient of the Pulitzer Prize
 James Valcq, composer
 Hoyt Vandenberg, General, U.S. Air Force
 Nick Viall, contestant on The Bachelor
 Paul Wagner, MLB player
 Steve Wagner, NFL player
 Lutz Wahl, U.S. Army Major General; Adjutant General of U.S. Army
 James W. Wahner, educator and Wisconsin State Representative
 Herman V. Wall, photographer
 John A. Wall, lawyer and Wisconsin State Representative
 Norm Wallen, MLB player
 Neale Donald Walsch, best-selling author of Conversations With God
 Jim Waskiewicz, NFL player
 Bruce Weber, head coach of University of Illinois men's basketball team
 Bill Weir, television journalist, co-anchor of ABC's Good Morning America Weekend Edition
 Norman Wengert, political scientist
 Gary George Wetzel, Medal of Honor recipient
 Joel Whitburn, American author and music historian 
 Jane Wiedlin, guitarist, vocalist, most notably for The Go-Go's
 Ken Wiesner, Olympic medalist
 John Wilde, painter
 Gene Wilder, actor known for Willy Wonka & the Chocolate Factory and collaborations with Mel Brooks, married Gilda Radner
 Robert Wilke, Air Force Cross recipient
 Mike Wilks, NBA player
 Red Wilson, MLB player
 Elmer Winter (1912–2009), founder of Manpower Inc.
 Edward Wollert, Navy Cross and Distinguished Service Cross recipient
 Whitey Wolter, NFL player
 Neil Worden, NFL player
 Sylvia Wronski, All-American Girls Professional Baseball League player (Milwaukee Chicks)
 Frank Albert Young, Medal of Honor recipient
 Clement J. Zablocki, U.S. Representative
 Ozias M. Zander, architect
 Frank P. Zeidler, ex-mayor of Milwaukee, Socialist Party USA leader
 Will Zens, filmmaker
 Nicholas S. Zeppos, chancellor of Vanderbilt University
 Steve Ziem, MLB player
 Chip Zien, actor
 Ray Zillmer, attorney, mountaineer and conservationist
 John A. Zoller, Wisconsin legislator
 Charlotte Zucker, actress, mother of David and Jerry Zucker
 David Zucker, film director, Airplane! and Top Secret!
 Jerry Zucker, film director, Airplane! and Top Secret!

Born elsewhere, raised in Milwaukee

The following people were not born in Milwaukee, but spent a significant amount of their growing-up years in the city.

 Naima Adedapo, American Idol finalist
 Shauna Singh Baldwin, Canadian-born author currently living in Milwaukee
 Elizabeth Banks, journalist
 Jacob Best, founder of what became the Pabst Brewing Company
 Elizabeth Baker Bohan, author, journalist, artist, social reformer
 Andrew H. Boncel, Wisconsin state legislator and newspaper editor
 Jack Carson, actor, Mildred Pierce, Cat on a Hot Tin Roof, A Star Is Born
 Keo Coleman, NFL player
 Michael Cudahy, industrialist, great-uncle of Michael Cudahy (electronics)
 Patrick Cudahy, industrialist
 Victor DeLorenzo, drummer for punk-rock group, the Violent Femmes
 Humphrey J. Desmond, Wisconsin legislator, lawyer, writer, and newspaper editor
 Colleen Dewhurst, Canadian-born actress raised in Milwaukee, two-time Tony Award winner, four-time Emmy Award winner
 Clarke Fischer, NFL player
 Garrett M. Fitzgerald, politician
 Evelyn Frechette, lover and accomplice of John Dillinger
 Gordon Gano, lead singer, guitarist and songwriter for the Violent Femmes
 Charles Goldenberg (1911–1986), Odessa-born All-Pro NFL player
 Wallace Wilson Graham, Wisconsin lawyer and politician
 Joseph Graybill, actor
 Elmer Grey, architect and painter
 Stone Hallquist, NFL player
 Albert Hammond, politician
 Matthea Harvey, poet
 Houdini, illusionist and stunt performer
 Jeffrey Hunter, actor, The Searchers, King of Kings
 John Johnson, NBA basketball player, First Team All-American at University of Iowa
 Warren S. Johnson, founder of Johnson Controls
 Kristen Johnston, born in Washington DC, raised in Whitefish Bay; played Sally Solomon in 3rd Rock from the Sun
 Al C. Kalmbach, born in Sturgeon Bay, Wisconsin, founder of Kalmbach Publishing
 Keedy, singer
 Harold Klemp, leader of Eckankar
 Tim Knoll, freestyle BMX rider
 Leon L. Lewis, attorney, spymaster, and Jewish community leader
 Rico Love, rapper and songwriter
 Jim Lovell, former NASA astronaut and commander of the Apollo 13 mission; North/South 7th Street through the downtown area was named James Lovell Street in his honor
 James Ludington, founder of Columbus, Wisconsin and Ludington, Michigan
 John Luick, American Civil War veteran; founder of Luick Ice Cream
 Arie Luyendyk Jr., professional auto racer, The Bachelorette contestant (Brookfield)
 Arthur MacArthur Jr., Medal of Honor recipient, military governor of the Philippines
 Rick Majerus, basketball coach; son of Raymond Majerus
 Golda Meir, a founder of State of Israel; served as Minister of Labor, Foreign Minister, and Prime Minister; graduated from the University of Wisconsin–Milwaukee
 Billy Mitchell, general, regarded as "father" of United States Air Force
 Ronald Myers, noted Baptist minister
 Joseph Arthur Padway, socialist politician
 Ray Phillips, NFL player
 Emma May Alexander Reinertsen, writer, social reformer
 Antonio R. Riley, Midwest Regional Administrator of the United States Department of Housing and Urban Development
 Martin P. Robinson, creator and puppeteer for the Jim Henson Company; puppeteer for Telly Monster, Mr. Snuffleupagus and Slimey (Brookfield)
 Gena Rowlands, Oscar-nominated actress, four-time Emmy Award winner
 Mark Rylance, theater actor and director; director of Shakespeare's Globe Theatre in London, two-time Tony Award winner
 David J. Saposs, economist
 Gottfried Schloemer, maker of first gas automobile in Milwaukee
 Landy Scott, champion race car driver
 Edward Steichen, in 1900 left Milwaukee to NYC, met Alfred Stieglitz who was married to Georgia O'Keeffe; world's highest-paid photographer
 Mike Taylor, NBA player
 Fred W. Vetter Jr., U.S. Air Force general
 George H. Walther, Wisconsin State Representative
 Walter Wangerin Jr., author
 Garrett Weber-Gale, U.S. Olympic swimmer
 Stanley G. Weinbaum, science fiction writer
 Oprah Winfrey, talk show host and media mogul
 Roger H. Zion, U.S. Representative from Indiana

Born in Milwaukee, raised elsewhere

The following people were born in Milwaukee, but spent most (if not all) of their growing-up years away from the city.

 Walter Annenberg, billionaire publisher, philanthropist, and creator of Annenberg Foundation
 Austin Aries, professional wrestler, former world champion
 J. Ogden Armour, owner and president of Armour and Company
 Paul M. Blayney, U.S. Coast Guard admiral
 Richard Nelson Bolles, author
 Rachel Brosnahan, actress
 Coo Coo Cal, singer, rapper
 Raja Chari, astronaut candidate
 Leroy Chiao, astronaut, commander and science officer of 10th expedition to International Space Station (ISS)
 George Croil, Royal Canadian Air Force Air Marshal; first Chief of the Air Staff
 Jeffrey Dahmer, serial killer raised in Ohio; returned to Milwaukee where he also committed acts of necrophilia and cannibalism
 Dan Davies, actor and screenwriter
 Ruth Bachhuber Doyle, member of Wisconsin Assembly, raised in Wausau; mother of Wisconsin Governor Jim Doyle
 Alex Galchenyuk, hockey player for the AHL's Colorado Eagles
 Jeff Gillan, journalist
 Doug Gottlieb, ESPN analyst, host of The Doug Gottlieb Show
 Heather Graham, film actress; best known for role as Roller Girl in Boogie Nights
 Mark Grudzielanek, MLB player
 Herbert James Hagerman, governor of New Mexico Territory
 Andrea Hall, twin sister of soap actress Deidre Hall; best known for her role as Samantha Evans on Days of Our Lives
 Deidre Hall, actress on soap opera Days of Our Lives and twin sister of actress Andrea Hall
 Dennis Hall, world champion wrestler, Olympic medalist; Pan American Games gold medalist
 Susan Lynn Hefle, food allergen scientist
 Ben Heller, MLB pitcher
 Ed Hochuli, NFL referee
 Michael Huebsch, politician
 Ernie Johnson Jr., Emmy Award-winning sportscaster
 Colin Kaepernick, quarterback for San Francisco 49ers
 Eric Kelly, NFL player
 George F. Kennan, architect of U.S. cold war policy of containment of Soviet Union
 Jalmar M. Kerttula, longest-serving member of the Alaska Legislature (1961–1963 and 1965–1995)
 Pee Wee King, songwriter, recording artist, and television entertainer; inducted into the Country Music Hall of Fame
 Jacob Latimore, R&B singer
 James J. Lindsay, U.S. Army General; first commander of United States Special Operations Command
 Bobby Marshall, NFL player, member of College Football Hall of Fame
 Ava Max, singer-songwriter 
 Chris Mihm, NBA player
 Steve Miller, musician, Steve Miller Band
 Raymond J. Moyer, politician
 Amir Omar, Texas politician
 Leslie Osborne, WPS player
 Peter Palmer, Broadway and film actor, most notably as Li'l Abner
 Otto A. Paulsen, Minnesota state representative and farmer
 Andre Phillips, Olympic gold medalist
 Armintie Price, WNBA player
 Joe Randa, MLB player
 Robert D. Richardson, biographer and historian
 Jay Schroeder, NFL player
 Mary Shane, pioneer sportscaster
 Cordwainer Smith (Paul Myron Anthony Linebarger), science fiction writer, East Asian scholar and expert in psychological warfare
 Bart Stupak, U.S. Representative from Michigan
 Eric Szmanda, actor, played Greg Sanders on CSI
 Peter G. Torkildsen, U.S. Representative from Massachusetts
 Butch Woolfolk, NFL player

Born and raised elsewhere

The following people were not born or raised in Milwaukee, but have a significant connection(s) to the city.

 Hank Aaron, Major League Baseball Hall of Famer; all-time leader in home runs; played majority of MLB career in Milwaukee
 Kareem Abdul-Jabbar, NBA Hall of Famer and first draft choice of Milwaukee Bucks
 George Abert, member of the Wisconsin State Assembly; father of George A. Abert
 Andrew J. Aikens, newspaper editor
 Anson Allen, politician and businessman
 Ray Allen, Milwaukee Bucks player from 1996 to 2003
 Edward P. Allis, co-founder of Allis-Chalmers Manufacturing Company
 John Anderson, NFL player
 Mathilde Franziska Anneke, feminist
 Giannis Antetokounmpo, Milwaukee Bucks player
 Jimmy Archer, MLB player
 Philip Danforth Armour, founder of Armour and Company
 Jap Barbeau, MLB player
 Lloyd Barbee, Wisconsin legislator
 William A. Barstow, Governor of Wisconsin; Union Army general
 John M Barth, Chairman and Chief Executive Officer of Johnson Controls
 John Knowlton Bartlett, Vice President of American Medical Association
 Charles S. Benton, U.S. Representative from New York
 Insoo Kim Berg, psychotherapist
 Victor L. Berger, first Socialist elected to U.S. House of Representatives
 Fred Blair, labor activist and politician
 Valentin Blatz, founder of Valentin Blatz Brewing Company
 Aaron T. Bliss, U.S. Representative from Michigan
 Robert Bloch, science fiction, fantasy and horror writer, author of Psycho
 Ernest Borgnine, Academy Award-winning actor
 Matthias J. Bovee, U.S. Representative from New York
 Emil Breitkreutz, Olympic medalist; head coach of USC Trojans men's basketball team
 Arthur Louis Breslich, president of German Wallace College and Baldwin-Wallace College
 Bunny Brief, MLB player
 Erhard Brielmaier, architect, designed many Milwaukee churches, buildings, and schools including The Basilica of St. Josaphat recipient
 Cecil B. Brown Jr., civil rights activist and legislator
 John A. Bryan, U.S. diplomat
 Larry Bucshon, U.S. Representative from Illinois
 Chris Bury, television journalist, Nightline correspondent
 Charles C. Byrne, U.S. Army general
 James Cameron, civil rights activist
 Raymond Joseph Cannon, U.S. Representative, attorney for the accused players during Black Sox Scandal
 Al Capone, Chicago gangster; had a "home" in Brookfield during Prohibition
 Bill Carollo, NFL referee
 Sam Cassell, NBA player for Milwaukee Bucks
 Benjamin F. Church, 1835 pioneer, builder and contractor; built Benjamin Church House, now a museum
 Pep Clark, MLB player
 Dighton Corson, Justice of the South Dakota Supreme Court
 Georgia Cozzini, politician
 Harriet L. Cramer, publisher of The Evening Wisconsin, a daily newspaper in Milwaukee
 John D. Cummins, U.S. Representative from Ohio
 Lysander Cutler, Union Army general
 Steven E. Day, U.S. Coast Guard admiral
 Willem Dafoe, actor, from Appleton, WI., lived in Milwaukee while with Theatre X in Third Ward; before moving to NYC where he spent 10 years before becoming well-known.
 Peter V. Deuster, diplomat
 Gene DeWeese, author
 Dustin Diamond, actor, "Screech" from Saved by the Bell TV sitcom; resides in Port Washington
 Joseph Doe, U.S. Assistant Secretary of War
 Timothy Dolan, Archbishop of the Roman Catholic Archdiocese of New York
 Charlie Dougherty, MLB player
 Tom Dougherty, MLB player
 David Draiman, rock musician, singer in heavy metal band Disturbed
 F. Ryan Duffy, Judge of the U.S. Court of Appeals
 Clifford Durr, member of Federal Communications Commission
 Hi Ebright, MLB player
 Lois Ehlert, illustrator; Caldecott Medal recipient
 Michael Elconin, member of Wisconsin State Assembly
 Gary Ellerson, NFL player for Green Bay Packers and Detroit Lions
 Alter Esselin, Yiddish poet, carpenter, 1889–1974
 Charles E. Estabrook, Wisconsin Attorney General
 Ole Evinrude, founder of Evirude Outboard Motors, inventor of first outboard motor with practical commercial application
 Edward T. Fairchild, jurist
 Chris Farley, born in Madison, Wisconsin, graduated from Marquette University; comedian and actor; cast member on Saturday Night Live
 Asahel Finch Jr., lawyer and politician
 Albert Fowler, mayor of Rockford, Illinois
 Charles F. Freeman, businessman and politician
 Harold A. Fritz, Medal of Honor recipient
 Ezekiel Gillespie, activist for equal rights for African Americans
 Luther F. Gilson, businessman and politician
 Guy D. Goff, U.S. Senator from West Virginia
 Paul Grottkau, radical newspaper publisher and labor organizer
 William G. Haan, U.S. Army Major General
 Jackson Hadley, politician and businessman
 Ardie Clark Halyard (1896–1989), co-owner of the first black-owned bank in Milwaukee
 J.J. Hagerman, industrialist
 Doc Hamann, baseball player
 Charles Smith Hamilton, Union Army Major General
 Gustav Otto Ludolf Heine, owner of Heine-Velox
 James L. Herdt, 9th Master Chief Petty Officer of the Navy
 Harrison Carroll Hobart, Union Army general
 Adrian Hoecken, Dutch missionary to the first nations
 Timothy E. Hoeksema, Chairman of Midwest Air Group
 Roy Hoffmann, U.S. Navy admiral
 James Holliday, lawyer
 Gertrude Hull, educator
 Bert Husting, MLB player
 John L. Jerstad, Medal of Honor recipient
 Electa Amanda Wright Johnson, philanthropist, writer
 Solomon Juneau, fur trader, land speculator, and co-founder of City of Milwaukee
 Francis Enmer Kearns, bishop of The Methodist Church and the United Methodist Church
 Alice Beck Kehoe, anthropologist
 Byron Kilbourn, Wisconsin railroad executive, politician, and co-founder of Milwaukee
 Jack Kilby, Nobel laureate and co-inventor of the integrated circuit (IC)
 Charles King, U.S. Army general
 Rufus King, Union Army general
 Adam Kinzinger, U.S. Representative from Illinois
 Al Klawitter, MLB player
 Nap Kloza, professional baseball player and manager
 Elmer Klumpp, MLB player
 Conrad Krez, Union Army general
 Ivanka Mandunić Kuzmanović, Croatian poet and historian
 Dan Lally, MLB player
 John H. Lang, war hero
 Increase A. Lapham, scientist; "father of the U.S. Weather Service"
 Alfred Lawson, credited as inventor of the airliner
 Jerris G. Leonard, administrator of the Law Enforcement Assistance Administration
 Judith Light, actress, star of Who's the Boss; acted in Milwaukee theater at "the Rep"
 Reginald Lisowski, professional wrestler known as "The Crusher"
 Casey Loomis, Navy Cross and Distinguished Service Cross recipient
 Scott Lorenz, MLS player
 Frank Luce, MLB player
 Arie Luyendyk, two-time Indianapolis 500 winner (Brookfield)
 Arthur MacArthur Sr, judge; father of Arthur MacArthur Jr and grandfather of General Douglas MacArthur
 Douglas MacArthur, U.S. Army General; U.S. Army Chief of Staff; Medal of Honor recipient
 Raymond Majerus, labor leader; father of Rick Majerus
 Dan Marion, MLB player
 Henry H. Markham, U.S. Representative from California
 Hattie McDaniel, Academy Award-winning actress; the first African American to win an Academy Award
 Francis E. McGovern, 22nd Governor of Wisconsin 
 Al McGuire, college basketball coach and television commentator, head coach of Marquette national championship team
 Eschines P. Matthews, Wisconsin Assemblyman and businessman
 Khris Middleton, Milwaukee Bucks player
 Frederick Miller, brewing magnate and founder of Miller Brewing Company; grandfather of Fred Miller
 Elias Molee, journalist; linguist
 Paul Molitor, baseball Hall of Famer; longtime player for Milwaukee Brewers
 Mary Mortimer (1816–1877), British-born American educator
 Frank Murray, head coach of Marquette Golden Avalanche and Virginia Cavaliers football teams, member of College Football Hall of Fame
 George New, artist
 George Nicol, MLB player
 Richard J. Nolan, Medal of Honor recipient
 Bill Norman, MLB player and manager
 Karl F. Nystrom, rail engineer; introduced a number of important innovations, including welded lightweight freight and passenger railcars
 John O'Malley, Wisconsin State Representative
 Frederick Pabst, brewing magnate of Pabst Brewing Company
 Halbert E. Paine, Union Army general; U.S. Representative
 Henry C. Payne, U.S. Postmaster General
 George Wilbur Peck, Governor of Wisconsin
 Hal Peck, MLB player
 Carlotta Perry, poet
 Joseph Perry, auxiliary bishop of the Roman Catholic Archdiocese of Chicago
 Jane and Lloyd Pettit, philanthropists of Bradley family fortune, who gifted Bradley Center and Pettit National Ice Center
 Marjorie Peters, All-American Girls Professional Baseball League player, born in Greenfield, WI and a longtime resident of Milwaukee
 Emanuel L. Philipp, 23rd Governor of Wisconsin and resident of Milwaukee
 Reince Priebus, Chairman of the Republican National Committee
 Michael Redd, Milwaukee Bucks shooting guard, holds Bucks' franchise record for points in a single game with 57
 Adolph Walter Rich, manufacturer and merchant
 Chester J. Roberts, head coach of Miami Redskins football and men's basketball teams
 Paul Robeson, pro football player, actor, singer and social activist
 Carl Sandburg, author, reporter, poet; worked as organizer for Wisconsin Social Democratic Party at headquarters in Milwaukee; met wife Lilian Steichen (Menomonee Falls) in 1907
 Joseph Schlitz, brewing magnate of now defunct Joseph Schlitz Brewing Company
 Carl Schurz, U.S. Secretary of the Interior
 John Sharpstein, Justice of the California Supreme Court
 Christopher Sholes, printer, politician, and newspaper editor; best known for inventing the modern day typewriter with its QWERTY key layout, while living in Milwaukee
 Abram D. Smith, Wisconsin Supreme Court justice
 Albert Smith, U.S. Representative from New York
 George A. Starkweather, U.S. Representative from New York
 John Converse Starkweather, Union Army general
 Thomas E. Stidham, NFL assistant coach
 Ellicott R. Stillman, Wisconsin State Representative
 William Story, Lieutenant Governor of Colorado
 Samuel Stritch, Roman Catholic cardinal
 Kenneth E. Stumpf, Medal of Honor recipient
 Ted Sullivan, MLB player and manager
 Monroe Swan, Wisconsin politician
 Jeffrey Tambor, actor, performed at Milwaukee Repertory Theater ("The Rep")
 Paul Francis Tanner, Bishop of the Roman Catholic Diocese of St. Augustine
 Adonis Terry, MLB player and umpire
 Thomas Toohey, Medal of Honor recipient
 Don A. J. Upham, 4th Mayor of Milwaukee
 Franklin Van Valkenburgh, Medal of Honor recipient
 Henry Vianden, artist
 Dwyane Wade, guard for NBA's Miami Heat who played collegiately at Marquette University
 George H. Walker, trader, politician, and co-founder of City of Milwaukee
 Howard Weiss, NFL player
 Tony Welzer, MLB player
 Don S. Wenger, U.S. Air Force Major General
 Mae West, actress, screenwriter, playwright, named 15th Greatest Female Film Star of All-Time by the American Film Institute
 Philo White, U.S. diplomat
 James Wieghart, journalist
 Frederick L. Wieseman, U.S. Marine Lieutenant general
 Frederick Charles Winkler, Union Army general
 George A. Woodward, U.S. Army general
 Christian Yelich, MLB player for the Milwaukee Brewers
 Cassin Young, Medal of Honor recipient
 Sheila Young, world champion speed skater and cyclist; Olympic gold medalist; member of United States Bicycling Hall of Fame, International Women's Sports Hall of Fame, and National Speedskating Hall of Fame
 Robin Yount, Major League Baseball Hall of Famer; player and bench coach for Milwaukee Brewers
 Elmo Zumwalt, Chief of Naval Operations

References

External links
 
 IMDB Biography Search 

Milwaukee
 
Milwaukee
People